The X Factor Indonesia is an Indonesian reality television music competition to find new singing talent, contested by aspiring singers drawn from public audition. The show was adopted from British The X Factor and produced by FremantleMedia (now Fremantle) and Cowell's production company Syco. It is broadcast on RCTI. In 2014, X Factor Indonesia won the Panasonic Gobel Awards for the category Talent and Best Reality Show.

As part of British The X Factor franchise, the show's format has numerous differences from rival shows such as Indonesian Idol. X Factor Indonesia is open to both solo artists and groups and has no upper age limit. Each judge is assigned one of four (five since the third season) categories—boys between 15 and 25, girls between 15 and 25, individuals 26 and over (split into males and females since the third season), or groups (which may also be formed from rejected soloists during the audition process). Throughout the live shows, the judges act as mentors to their category, helping to decide song choices, styling and staging, while judging contestants from the other categories; they also compete to ensure that their act wins the competition, thus making them the winning judge.

The original judging panel lineup consisted of Ahmad Dhani, Rossa, Anggun, and Bebi Romeo, with Robby Purba as the sole host. The show has produced three winners to date: Fatin Shidqia (Girls), Jebe & Petty (Groups), and Alvin Jonathan (Boys). After a six-year hiatus, on July 10, 2021, Fremantle Indonesia announced that X Factor Indonesia will return with the third season.

History
Although Indonesian Idol went on to become an enormous success and the number 1 show in Indonesia for seven consecutive seasons, the original United Kingdom version, Pop Idol did not fare so well. Cowell, who was a judge on Pop Idol, wished to launch a show which he owned the rights to. Pop Idols first series was massively successful, and while the second series was also successful, the viewers figure for its finale dropped. Some—including Pop Idol judge Pete Waterman— considered Michelle McManus an unworthy winner. In 2004, Pop Idol was axed and ITV announced a new show created by former Pop Idol judge Simon Cowell, with no involvement from Idol creator Simon Fuller—The X Factor. Its ratings were average in the first couple of series, but by the sixth series in 2009, ratings were hitting 10 million each week.

In March 2010, RCTI, the broadcaster of Indonesian Idol, signed the deal to launch the Indonesian version of The X Factor. Initially, X Factor Indonesia was planned as a replacement for Indonesian Idol in 2013, but due to the enormous success of the seventh season in 2012, RCTI and FremantleMedia decided to continue collaborating both the X Factor Indonesia and Indonesian Idol with each playing on alternate years. To repeat the success of seventh season of Indonesian Idol, Fabian Dharmawan from RCTI was appointed to be the Executive Producer for RCTI for the first season of the X Factor Indonesia, Head of Entertainment of FremantleMedia, Glenn Sims together with Virgita Ruchiman and Ken Irawati serving as Executive Producers for FremantleMedia Indonesia (Virgita now as general manager at VIP Production, subsidiary of SCM).

X Factor premiered in Indonesia on December 28, 2012.

Format and prize

Categories
The show is primarily concerned with identifying singing talent, though appearance, personality, stage presence and dance routines are also an important element of many performances. Each judge is assigned one of four categories: "Girls" (aged 15–25 females), "Boys" (aged 15–25 males), "Over 26s" (solo acts aged 26 and over), or "Groups" (including duos; some of which may be formed from rejected soloists after the audition process). Through the live shows, the judges act as mentors to their category, helping to decide song choices, styling and staging, while judging contestants from other categories. Start from third season, "Over 26s" divided to two categories: "Male" and "Female" based on contestants gender.

Stages
There are five stages to the competition:
 Stage 1: Producers' auditions (these auditions decide who will sing in front of the judges)
 Stage 2: Judges' auditions
 Stage 3: Bootcamp (including a six-chair challenge since season 2)
 Stage 4: Judges' houses
 Stage 5: Live shows (finals)

Auditions
The show is open to solo artists and vocal groups aged 15 and above, with no upper age limit. The first set of auditions is held in front of the show's producers, which is not televised. Only candidates who successfully pass the producers' auditions are invited to perform to the judges. The judges' auditions are held in front of a live audience and the acts sing over a backing track. In that case, at least three out of four judges (two out of three, for the panel of three judges) have to say "yes" for the auditionee to advance to the next round, otherwise they are sent home. In addition, there is an online audition too in which the auditionees can upload their performance on the X Factor Indonesia website and the get the vote from viewers on YouTube. An auditionee with the most voted video will get the chance to meet the judges and awarded cash prize.

A selection of the auditions in front of the judges – usually the best, the worst and the most bizarre – are broadcast over the first few weeks of the show.

Bootcamp and judges' home visits
The contestants selected at auditions are further refined through a series of performances at "bootcamp", and then at the "judges' home visits", until a small number eventually progress to the live finals. In the bootcamp, contestants will have to go through a series of challenges until the number of contestants were trimmed down and divided according to their categories. At the end of bootcamp, the producers will also reveal which category the judges will be mentoring. The judges then disband for the "judges' home visits" round, where they further reduce their acts on location at a residence with the help of a celebrity guest mentor.

Live shows
The finals consist of a series of two gala live shows, with the first featuring the contestants' performances and the second revealing the results of the public voting. Celebrity guest performers will be featured regularly.

Performances
The performance show occasionally begins with a group performance from the remaining contestants. The show is primarily concerned with identifying a potential pop star or star group, and singing talent, appearance, personality, stage presence and dance routines are all important elements of the contestants' performances. In the initial live shows, each act performs once in the first show in front of a studio audience and the judges, usually singing over a pre-recorded backing track. Dancers are also commonly featured. Acts occasionally accompany themselves on guitar or piano.

Each live show has had a different theme; each contestant's song is chosen according to the theme. After each act has performed, the judges comment on their performance. Heated disagreements, usually involving judges defending their contestants against criticism, are a regular feature of the show. Once all the acts have appeared, the phone lines open and the viewing public vote on which act they want to keep. Once the number of contestants has been reduced to six, each act would perform twice in the performances show. This continues until only three acts remain. These acts go on to appear in the grand final which decides the overall winner by public vote.

Results
The two acts polling the fewest votes are revealed. Both these acts have to perform again in a "final showdown", and the judges vote on which of the two to send home. They were able to pick new songs to perform in the "final showdown". Ties are possible as there are four judges voting on which of the two to send home. In the event of a tie the result goes to deadlock, and the act who came last in the public vote is sent home. The actual number of votes cast for each act is not revealed, nor even the order. Once the number of contestants has been reduced to five, the act which polled the fewest votes is automatically eliminated from the competition (the judges do not have a vote; their only role is to comment on the performances).

After X Factor Indonesia
The winner of the X Factor Indonesia is awarded a recording contract from Sony Music Indonesia for season 1 until 2 and Hits Records since season 3, which would include investments worth 1 billion rupiah, which is claimed as the largest guaranteed prize in Indonesian television history. Several cash rewards from the sponsors, including a new car and motorcycle, is also awarded for the grand finalists in the first season.

Series overview
To date, three seasons have been broadcast, as summarized below.

 Contestant in (or mentor of) "Boys" category
 Contestant in (or mentor of) "Girls" category
 Contestant in (or mentor of) "26+" category
 Contestant in (or mentor of) "Groups" category

Notes

  Mulan Jameela served as guest judge for one of the auditions to replace Anggun temporarily.

Judges and hosts

Many people were rumored to be in the running to join the judging panel, including Indra Lesmana, Titi DJ, Maia Estianty, Vina Panduwinata, Tompi, Anang Hermansyah, Sherina Munaf, Agnes Monica, Ruth Sahanaya, and Iwan Fals. Eventually, Dewa 19-frontman, musician, songwriter, and record producer Ahmad Dhani, singer, musician, and songwriter Bebi Romeo, pop diva Rossa, and international diva Anggun were confirmed to join this show as judges. Pop sensational singer Mulan Jameela filled in for Anggun at the auditions while Anggun was performing in her Europe Live Tour Concert. Numerous people were speculated to host the series, including VJ Boy William and Daniel Mananta, host of Indonesian Idol. On November 23, 2012, ex-VJ Robby Purba was announced as host of the show.

Judges' categories and their contestants
In each season, each judge is allocated a category to mentor and chooses a small number of acts (three for season one) to progress to the live shows. This table shows, for each season, which category each judge was allocated and which acts he or she put through to the live shows.

Key:

 – Winning judge/category. Winners are in bold, eliminated contestants in small font.

Reception

Television ratings

All information from this table comes from Nielsen Audience Measurement Indonesia.

Controversy and criticism
In week six of season one, Ahmad Dhani and Rossa opted to send home Alex Rudiart in favor of Gede Bagus, causing the elimination of Alex Rudiart. This decision resulted in large amount of criticisms and outrages from the public, who claimed the decision as unfair. As a result, a lot of social media reactions begin to appear including several motion to boycott the show.

Media sponsorship
On September 29, 2012, RCTI, SYCOtv and FremantleMedia Asia announced that Cross Mobile (now Evercoss) would be the official sponsor of the X Factor Indonesia. The sponsorship includes an extensive multi-platform on and off-air marketing partnership. On December 26, Kopi ABC was announced as the second official sponsor of the show. Kopi ABC's sponsorship will also include an extensive multi-platform on and off-air marketing partnership. Indosat Mentari was confirmed as the third official sponsor on December 28. Indosat Mentari's sponsorship of the X Factor Indonesia will also include an extensive multi-platform on and off-air marketing partnership between Indosat and MNC Sky Vision. Oriflame also sponsored the show as the official make-up sponsor. Procter & Gamble using it as a platform to promote its Pantene, Olay and Downy brands. The motorcycle sponsor for the first season of X Factor Indonesia is owned by Honda. In 2015, Evercoss was replaced by Oppo as the official sponsor of the X Factor Indonesia. GIV (Wings Care), Indomie (Indofood) and Teh Pucuk Harum (Mayora Indah) also joined as the official sponsor of the X Factor Indonesia. In 2021, Honda (supporting sponsor in season 1) and Indomie (main sponsor in season 2) rejoined as the official sponsor of the X Factor Indonesia, along with Lazada and Snack Video as main sponsor in season 3.

Awards and nominations

References

External links
Official website
peserta x factor yang keluar tadi malam

 
Television series by Fremantle (company)
2012 Indonesian television series debuts
Indonesian music television series
Indonesian reality television series
Indonesian-language television shows
RCTI original programming
Indonesian television series based on British television series